Louis Phélypeaux (1598–1681), seigneur de La Vrillière, marquis de Châteauneuf and Tanlay (1678), comte de Saint-Florentin, was a French politician.

He was the son of Raymond Phélypeaux (†1629), seigneur d'Herbault et de La Vrillière.  He was made a Minister of State in 1621, and he was Secretary of State for Protestant Affairs from 1629 to 1681.  He was also Provost and Master of Ceremonies of the Ordre du Saint-Esprit from 1643 to 1653.

He was the father of Balthazar Phélypeaux (1638–1700) and grandfather of Louis Phélypeaux (1672–1725).

He died in 1681, and is buried in a baroque tomb in the church of Saint Martial of Châteauneuf-sur-Loire.

See also
 Louis Phélypeaux (disambiguation)
 Phélypeaux

References
This article is based on a translation of the article Louis Phélypeaux (1598-1681) from the French Wikipedia on 30 August 2006.

1598 births
1681 deaths
French politicians